Arthur L. Todd (February 12, 1895, in New Jersey – August 28, 1942, in Oceanside, New York) was an American cinematographer whose work included Hot Saturday (1932), I've Got Your Number (1934) and You're in the Army Now (1941).

Partial filmography

 Desert Gold (1919)
 The Lord Loves the Irish (1919)
 The Dream Cheater (1920)
 $30,000 (1920)
 The House of Whispers (1920)
 Number 99 (1920)
 The Green Flame (1920)
 The Devil to Pay (1920)
 Live Sparks (1920)
 According to Hoyle (1922)
The Isle of Lost Ships (1923)
The Brass Bottle (1923)
In Every Woman's Life (1924)
The White Moth (1924)
Torment (1924)
Gold Heels (1924)
One Year to Live (1925)
Just a Woman (1925)
What Happened to Jones (1926)
Take It from Me (1926)
Skinner's Dress Suit (1926)
Rolling Home (1926)
Her Big Night (1926)
 Watch Your Wife (1926)
Fast and Furious (1927)
Out All Night (1927)
 The Lone Eagle (1927)
Hot Heels (1928)
 Golf Widows (1928)
How to Handle Women (1928)
One Hysterical Night (1929)
The Forward Pass (1929)
Loose Ankles (1930)
Thus is Life (1930)
What a Man! (1930)
Monkey Business (1931)
Million Dollar Legs (1932)
Hot Saturday (1932)
She Had to Say Yes (1933)
Wild Horse Mesa (1933)
Elmer, the Great (1933)
Wild Boys of the Road (1933)
Ever in My Heart (1933)
Girl Missing (1933)
College Coach (1933)
Harold Teen (1934)
Return of the Terror (1934)
Babbitt (1934)
Big Hearted Herbert (1934)
I've Got Your Number (1934)
Miss Pacific Fleet (1935)
Alibi Ike (1935)
Red Hot Tires (1935)
Broadway Hostess (1935)
Get Rich Quick (short, 1935)
We're in the Money (1935)
The Payoff (1935)
The Florentine Dagger (1935)
Snowed Under (1936)
The Murder of Dr. Harrigan (1936)
Earthworm Tractors (1936)
Murder by an Aristocrat (1936)
Down the Stretch (1936)
Jailbreak (1936)
Here Comes Carter (1936)
Boulder Dam (1936)
Marry the Girl (1937)
The Singing Marine (1937)
The Adventurous Blonde (1937)
Sh! The Octopus (1937)
Men in Exile (1937)
Sing Me a Love Song (1937)
Melody for Two (1937)
Back in Circulation (1937)
Her Husband's Secretary (1937)
Crime School (1938)
He Couldn't Say No (1938)
Penrod's Double Trouble (1938)
Going Places (1938)
The Amazing Mr. Williams (1939)
Torchy Plays with Dynamite (1939)
The Man Who Dared (1939)
Dead End Kids on Dress Parade (1939)
Naughty But Nice (1939)
The Angels Wash Their Faces (1939)
South of Suez (1940)
An Angel from Texas (1940)
A Fugitive from Justice (1940)
River's End (1940)
Three Sons o' Guns (1941)
Badmen of Missouri (1941)
The Smiling Ghost (1941)
The Great Mr. Nobody (1941)
Lady Gangster (1942)

External links

1895 births
1942 deaths
American cinematographers
People from New Jersey